Clark Nunatak is a rocky peak rising to 147 m at the southwest edge of the ice cap of Rotch Dome in western Livingston Island, South Shetland Islands, Antarctica near the south extremity of Urvich Wall. It surmounts Volturnus Lake on the south.

The feature is named after Daniel Clark, First Mate of the American sealing vessel Hersilia under Captain James Sheffield in 1820–21.

Location

Maps
 Península Byers, Isla Livingston. Mapa topográfico a escala 1:25000. Madrid: Servicio Geográfico del Ejército, 1992.
 L.L. Ivanov et al. Antarctica: Livingston Island and Greenwich Island, South Shetland Islands. Scale 1:100000 topographic map. Sofia: Antarctic Place-names Commission of Bulgaria, 2005.
 L.L. Ivanov. Antarctica: Livingston Island and Greenwich, Robert, Snow and Smith Islands. Scale 1:120000 topographic map. Troyan: Manfred Wörner Foundation, 2009.

References
 SCAR Composite Antarctic Gazetteer.

Nunataks of Livingston Island